Kangbao County is a county in the northwest of Hebei province, China. It is under the administration of Zhangjiakou City and is its northernmost county-level division, bordering Inner Mongolia to the north, east, and west.

Administrative divisions

Towns:
Kangbao Town, Zhangji, Tuchengzi, Dengyoufang, Lijiadi, Zhaoyanghe, Tunken

Townships:
Geyoufang Township, Danqinghe Township, Habiga Township, Erhaobu Township, Lujiaying Township, Zhongyi Township, Chuchangdi Township, Mandetang Township

Climate

References

External links
 

County-level divisions of Hebei
Zhangjiakou